Ryan Graham Leslie Carters (born 25 July 1990) is an Australian former cricketer who represented New South Wales in the Australian domestic cricket competition and the Sydney Sixers in the Big Bash League. In May 2017, he announced his retirement from all forms of cricket.

Originally from Canberra, Carters played for the ACT Comets in the Cricket Australia Cup as well as Wests/ University of Canberra Cricket Club in the local Canberra grade competition.  Carters moved to Melbourne in the 2009–10 season, making his first class debut in 2010 for Victoria. He moved to New South Wales for the 2013–1414 season, and cemented his place in the Shield team with hundreds in back-to-back Sheffield Shield matches at the start of the season. He was awarded the NSW 2013–1414 Sheffield Shield Player of the Year and the following season won the NSW One Day Player of the Year award.

Carters is the founder of Batting for Change, in partnership with the LBW Trust Charity.

Retirement 
Carters retired from all forms of cricket on 12 May 2017. He played 43 first class matches. He left the game to pursue higher education at Harvard University with the goal of leadership and service. He received his Master of Public Policy from Harvard in 2020.

References

External links
Batting for Change

Living people
1990 births
Sportspeople from Canberra
Australian cricketers
Victoria cricketers
Cricketers from the Australian Capital Territory
Sydney Thunder cricketers
Sydney Sixers cricketers
New South Wales cricketers
Harvard Kennedy School alumni
Wicket-keepers